Andrea Kobetić (née Penezić; born 13 November 1985) is a retired Croatian handball player who was last played for Siófok KC and the Croatia women's national handball team.

She represented Croatia at the 2008 European Women's Handball Championship, where Croatia finished 6th, and Kobetić was among the top-ten goalscorers.

She topped the Champions League goalscorers list in 2015 alongside Cristina Neagu.

Achievements
 Croatian League
Winners: 2009, 2010
 Croatian Cup
Winners: 2009, 2010
Slovenian First League (women's handball)
Winners: 2011, 2012, 2013, 2014
Slovenian Cup
Winners: 2011, 2012, 2013, 2014
Slovenian Supercup
Winners: 2014

Macedonian First League
Winners: 2015,2016,2017,2018
Macedonian Cup
Winners: 2015,2016,2017,2018
EHF Champions League
Silver medalist: 2017, 2018
Third place: 2015, 2016
EHF Cup
Winners: 2019''

Awards
All-Star Left Back of the World Championship: 2011
EHF Champions League Top Scorer: 2015 (with Cristina Neagu)
EHF Cup Top Scorer: 2019

References

External links

  
1985 births
Living people
Handball players from Zagreb
Croatian female handball players
Olympic handball players of Croatia
Handball players at the 2012 Summer Olympics
Croatian expatriate sportspeople in North Macedonia
Expatriate handball players
Croatian expatriate sportspeople in Slovenia
RK Podravka Koprivnica players
21st-century Croatian women